Zławieś Wielka  is a community in Toruń County, Kuyavian-Pomeranian Voivodeship, in north-central Poland. It is the seat of the gmina (administrative district) called Gmina Zławieś Wielka. The community consists of the villages: Cegielnik, Cichoradz, Czarne Błoto, Czarnowo, Górsk, Gutowo, Łążyn, Pędzewo, Przysiek, Rozgarty, Rzęczkowo, Siemoń, Skłudzewo, Stary Toruń, Toporzysko, Zarośle Cienkie, Zławieś Mała, and Zławieś Wielka.

Projects
Zławieś Wielka has 3 projects: Co-financing for residents, Co-financing of the commune, and building roads.

Co-financing for residents
 Applications for construction of household sewage plans (Ends:July 6th)
 Applications for replacement of heat sources powered by solid fuels under Stop for smog 2020

Co-financing of the commune
Establishment of commune center
Objectives:
Increase social activity
Reduce the level of poverty and social exclusion
Economic recovery
Contractor: Przedsiębiorstwo Usługowe ARBUD Justyna Popielewska based in Młyniec Drugi, ul. Żwirowa 17, 87-162 Lubicz Górny.
Date agreement made:October 14, 2020
Recreation Area(Playground)
Goals:
Create areas for tourists
improve the quality of life
Includes:
A play set
A swing
A springboard
weight swings
A carousel
A sandbox

Extra Information

There are 3 libraries in Zławieś Wielka, and there are 9 schools. There is a social welfare center with 15 workers. There are also lots of benefits in the Family Benefits Office, which are mostly for having children.

References

Villages in Toruń County